Ryann is a female given name. Notable people with the name include:

 Ryann Donnelly (born 1986), American musical artist
 Ryann Holmes (born 1984), American consultant
 Ryann Krais (born 1990), American athlete
 Ryann O'Toole (born 1987), American professional golfer
 Ryann Redmond, American actress
 Ryann Richardson, American political activist
 Ryann Shane (born 1993), American actress
 Ryann Torrero (born 1990), Chilean footballer

Feminine given names